Harij is a city and a municipality in Patan district in the Indian state of Gujarat.

Geography
It has an average elevation of 33 metres (108 feet).

Demographics
 India census, Harij had a population of 18,388. Males constitute 53% of the population and females 47%. Harij has an average literacy rate of 57%, lower than the national average of 59.5%: male literacy is 65%, and female literacy is 47%. In Harij, 15% of the population is under 6 years of age.

References

Cities and towns in Patan district